Taryana or Tareiana was an ancient city in southwestern Iran (Persia) where present Ahvaz is located, its history dates back to c. 500 BC.

See also

 Khuzestan
 History of Iran
 Ahvaz

External links
 A brief history of Ahvaz. (in Persian)
 Brief history of Khuzestan, including Ahvaz. (in English)
 Short history of Taryana. (in Persian)

Former populated places in Khuzestan Province
Ahvaz